Malakpur is a village in Shaheed Bhagat Singh Nagar district of Punjab State, India. The village is administrated by Sarpanch an elected representative of the village.

Demography 
As of 2011, Malakpur has a total number of 73 houses and population of 353 of which 190 include are males while 163 are females according to the report published by Census India in 2011. The literacy rate of Malakpur is 92.24%, higher than the state average of 75.84%. The population of children under the age of 6 years is 31 which is 8.78% of total population of Malakpur, and child sex ratio is approximately 1067 as compared to Punjab state average of 846.

Most of the people are from Schedule Caste which constitutes 3.68% of total population in Malakpur. The town does not have any Schedule Tribe population so far.

As per the report published by Census India in 2011, 132 people were engaged in work activities out of the total population of Malakpur which includes 108 males and 24 females. According to census survey report 2011, 69.70% workers describe their work as main work and 30.30% workers are involved in Marginal activity providing livelihood for less than 6 months.

Education 
KC Engineering College and Doaba Khalsa Trust Group Of Institutions are the nearest colleges.

List of schools nearby:
Dashmesh Model School, Kahma
Govt Primary School, Kahlon
Govt High School, Garcha

Transport 

See also 
List of villages in India

References

External links 
 Tourism of Punjab
 Census of Punjab
 Locality Based PINCode

Villages in Shaheed Bhagat Singh Nagar district